This is a listing of cemeteries in the U.S. state of Kansas.

U.S. National Cemeteries
Kansas has three United States National Cemeteries which are all administered by the United States Department of Veterans Affairs and overseen from the Leavenworth National Cemetery.  They were added to the National Register of Historic Places in 1999.

Other cemeteries

See also
 List of cemeteries in the United States
 List of national cemeteries by country

References

Cemeteries
Kansas